La Plata is a partido (department) in Buenos Aires Province, Argentina, some  southeast of the city of Buenos Aires.

Its capital is La Plata, which also serves as the capital of the province. La Plata is the centre of the Greater La Plata urban conurbation.

Many of the suburbs have train links to both Buenos Aires and La Plata, and also good road access via the Buenos Aires-La Plata toll highway. There is also an extensive network of buses serving the Greater La Plata area.

The city of Manuel B. Gonnet features the República de los Niños theme park.

Several parks lie along the Camino General Belgrano road, which crosses the department north-to-south, notably the Parque Pereyra Iraola.

Education

The city has a good number of educational institutions at various levels, both public and private. The most renowned public schools are three of the four members of the UNLP: the Colegio Nacional Rafael Hernández, the Liceo Víctor Mercante and the Bachillerato de Bellas Artes.

La Plata is a symbol of a distinguished and prolific academy.

Sports
La Plata is home to one of the fiercest derby matches (clásicos) in Argentine football, contested between Estudiantes and Gimnasia y Esgrima.

Settlements
Abasto
City Bell
El Peligro
Joaquín Gorina
Lisandro Olmos
La Plata (capital)
Los Hornos
Manuel B. Gonnet
Melchor Romero
Ringuelet
Tolosa
Villa Elvira
Villa Elisa

References

External links

 
 La Plata at Observatorioamba.org
 Visita La Plata

 
Partidos of Buenos Aires Province
1882 establishments in Argentina